Carriers at War 1941-1945: Fleet Carrier Operations in the Pacific is a 1992 wargame by Strategic Studies Group for MS-DOS and Macintosh. It is a remake of the 1984 Carriers at War. An expansion pack, Carriers at War: Construction Kit, was released in 1993. A sequel, Carriers at War II, was also released in 1993.

Gameplay
Carriers at War is a strategic war game which features historic, fictional, and random scenarios featuring the naval and air forces in the Pacific in World War II. The player controls either the U.S. (Allied) or Japanese forces (Axis).

Reception

In 1992 Computer Gaming World reviewed the new version of Carriers at War, which it described as having "only a superficial resemblance to its 8-bit predecessor" with a mouse-driven interface. The magazine praised the realism of combat including the fog of war, and liked the intelligence of the computer opponent while stating that a human was still better. It concluded that "CAW is the most accurate simulation of carrier warfare available and is by far the best for solitaire play. Players interested in the Pacific Theater of World War II should not miss it". A 1993 survey by Computer Gaming World of wargames rated the revised version three-plus stars, criticizing the lack of a campaign. In 1994 the magazine said that the MS-DOS version "was a milestone in computer wargame history". The game was reviewed in 1993 in Dragon #193 by Hartley, Patricia, and Kirk Lesser in "The Role of Computers" column. The reviewers gave the game 4 out of 5 stars.

In 1996, Computer Gaming World declared Carriers at War the 90th-best computer game ever released. The magazine's wargame columnist Terry Coleman named it his pick for the sixth-best computer wargame released by late 1996.

Reviews
Computer Gaming World - Sep, 1993
ASM (Aktueller Software Markt) - Oct, 1992

See also
Carrier Strike

References

External links
Carriers at War at MobyGames

1992 video games
Aircraft carriers in fiction
Computer wargames
DOS games
DOS-only games
Naval video games
Single-player video games
Strategic Studies Group games
Video game remakes
Video games developed in Australia
Video games with expansion packs
World War II games